Puerto Rico Highway 14 (PR-14) is a main highway connecting Cayey, Puerto Rico to Ponce, Puerto Rico. The road runs the same course as the historic Carretera Central. The Coamo-to-Ponce section of PR-14 was built under the direction of Spanish engineer Raimundo Camprubí Escudero (b. Pamplona 15 March 1846 - d. Madrid 1924).

Route description

PR-14 is one of the roads that lead into the Ponce Historic Zone.

Major intersections

See also

 List of highways in Ponce, Puerto Rico
 List of highways numbered 14
 List of streets in Ponce, Puerto Rico

References

External links
 
 Carretera Militar/Military Road Porto Rico. Overland Monthly and Out West Magazine. Page 321. Retrieved 27 July 2013.

014